Eva Bayer-Fluckiger (born 25 June 1951) is a Hungarian and Swiss mathematician. She is an Emmy Noether Professor Emeritus at École Polytechnique Fédérale de Lausanne. She has worked on several topics in topology, algebra and number theory, e.g. on the theory of knots, on lattices, on quadratic forms and on Galois cohomology. Along with Raman Parimala, she proved Serre's conjecture II regarding the Galois cohomology of a simply-connected semisimple algebraic group  when such a group is of classical type.

Early life and career
Bayer-Fluckiger was born in Budapest, Hungary. She attended the University of Geneva, where she obtained her doctorate under supervision of Michel Kervaire in 1978. She was a visiting scholar at the Institute for Advanced Study from 1983 to 1984. Since 1990, she is an executive committee member of the European Mathematical Society and since 2006 served on editorial board of its Commentarii Mathematici Helvetici.

Awards
In 2001, the Essen College of Gender Studies gave Bayer-Fluckiger their Maria Sibylla Merian Prize, "for her achievements and her commitment in the French and European Association of Woman Mathematicians". She was named a Fellow of the American Mathematical Society, in the 2022 class of fellows, "for contributions to number theory, algebra, and topology, and for service to the profession".

References

External links
Website at EPFL

1951 births
Living people
20th-century Swiss mathematicians
21st-century Swiss mathematicians
University of Geneva alumni
Institute for Advanced Study visiting scholars
Academic staff of the École Polytechnique Fédérale de Lausanne
20th-century women mathematicians
21st-century women mathematicians
Swiss women mathematicians
Fellows of the American Mathematical Society